Frum is a surname that may refer to:
Meaning: pious, observant (Yiddish). It also is patronymic, and of biblical origin, likely derived from a variant of Abraham, Afrom. 

 Barbara Frum, Canadian journalist
 Barbara Frum (TV series)
 Danielle Frum, wife of David 
 David Frum, political commentator and journalist, son of Barbara 
 John Frum, figure associated with cargo cults on the island of Tanna in Vanuatu
 Linda Frum, Canadian journalist, daughter of Barbara

See also 
 Fromm (German form)
 Frum Jew
 Frum Satire

References 

Jewish surnames
Germanic-language surnames
Yiddish-language surnames